Antonio de la Torre Villalpando (21 September 1951 – 2 August 2021) was a Mexican professional footballer who played as a defender, spending most of his career with Club América.

Career
De la Torre helped Club América win the 1975–76 Primera División de México Cup along with 1978 CONCACAF Champions' Cup and  the Copa Interamericana that same year. He was also part of the 1978 FIFA World Cup in Argentina. He played for America for five years before joining Puebla F.C. where he won the 1982–83 Primera División Mexicana. After two years with Puebla he decided to retire.

Personal life
He was the father of Antonio de la Torre García.

He died on 2 August 2021, aged 69.

Honours
América
 Primera División Mexicana: 1975–76
 Copa Interamericana: 1977

Puebla
 Primera División Mexicana: 1982–83

References

External links
 
 
 

1951 births
2021 deaths
Mexican footballers
Association football defenders
Mexico international footballers
1978 FIFA World Cup players
CONCACAF Championship-winning players
Liga MX players
De La Torre
Club Universidad Nacional footballers
Club Puebla players
Club América footballers
De La Torre
Atlas F.C. footballers
Footballers from Mexico City
Mexican expatriate footballers
Mexican expatriate sportspeople in the United States
De La Torre